Farlington is a small village and civil parish in the Hambleton District of North Yorkshire, England. A small stream, the Farlington beck, runs through the village.

History

Farlington is mentioned in the Domesday Book as Falinton in the Bulford Hundred. At the time of the Norman invasion the manor was in the name of Ligulf, but passed to Robert, Count of Mortain who made Nigel Fossard the lord of the manor in his stead.

Farlington, as a name, originates before the Domesday Book.  Its origins are likely to be Anglo Saxon where the meaning would be the settlement, -ton, of the Feorlings clan.

Governance

The village is within the Thirsk and Malton UK Parliament constituency. It lies within the Stillington ward of Hambleton District Council and Stillington electoral division of North Yorkshire County Council.

Geography

The nearest settlements are Stillington  to the west; Sheriff Hutton  to the east-south-east; Brandsby-cum-Stearsby  to the north and Sutton-on-the-Forest  to the south-west.

According to the 1881 UK Census, the population was 168. The 2001 UK Census recorded the population as 124, of which 94 were over the age of sixteen. Of those, 64 were in employment. The village contains 47 dwellings of which 34 are detached properties.

Amenities

The village has a pub, a church, a village hall, a red telephone box and a post box.  Primary education is provided at nearby Sheriff Hutton, Stillington and Sutton on the Forest CE Primary Schools. These schools are within the catchment area of Easingwold School for secondary education.

Religion

St Leonard's Anglican Church, on the outskirts of the village, is substantially a 12th-century structure, only altered by the addition of buttresses and windows of various dates and extensive restoration in the twentieth century.   It is small rectangular building 50 ft. by 16 ft. (internal measurements), consisting of a nave and chancel without structural division, a vestry north of the chancel and a western bell cote. A Grade II Listed Building, it was partially restored in 1887.

References

Villages in North Yorkshire
Civil parishes in North Yorkshire